was a town located in Tsukui District, Kanagawa Prefecture, Japan.

As of March 1, 2007, final population data before the amalgamation, the town had an estimated population of 23,040 and a density of 1157.8 persons per km2. The total area was 19.90 km2.

On March 11, 2007, Shiroyama, along with the town of Fujino (also from Tsukui District), was merged into the expanded city of Sagamihara, and thus no longer exists as an independent municipality. It is now part of Midori-ku. The merger was controversial, and the mayor of Shiroyama was recalled for his opposition to the merger.

References 

Populated places disestablished in 2007
Dissolved municipalities of Kanagawa Prefecture